Bicho is one of the woredas in the Oromia Region of Ethiopia. Part of the former Metu, it is now part of the Illubabor Zone.

Demographics 
The 2007 national census reported a total population for this woreda of 24,947, of whom 12,512 were men and 12,435 were women; 1,555 or 6.25% of its population were urban dwellers. The majority of the inhabitants were Moslem, with 72.68% of the population reporting they observed this belief, while 19.1% of the population said they practised Ethiopian Orthodox Christianity, and 8.1% were Protestant.

Notes 

Districts of Oromia Region